Trihesperus is a small genus of flowering plants in the family Asparagaceae, generally found in the Andes of Colombia, Ecuador, Peru, Bolivia, and northwest Argentina. Veitch Nurseries developed a cultivar of Trihesperus latifolius with striped foliage which they called Anthericum latifolium albo media pictum.

Species
Currently accepted species include:

Trihesperus glaucus (Ruiz & Pav.) Herb.
Trihesperus latifolius (Kunth) Herb.

References

Agavoideae
Asparagaceae genera